Ruswarp is a railway station on the Esk Valley Line, which runs between Middlesbrough and Whitby via Nunthorpe. It is owned by Network Rail and managed by Northern Trains.

History
The station first appears in a timetable for May 1848, though it was used before that; in July 1835, over 1,000 people were carried between Pickering and Ruswarp for the Ruswarp Fair Day.

The main railway building, which remains to this day and is now grade II listed, was designed by the architect G T Andrews and was built in 1850 at the request of the York and North Midland Railway who owned the line through acquisition. Immediately to the west of the station is an automatic barrier level crossing and a lattice-work iron bridge over the River Esk. The design of the station was similar to that at  railway station, but with Tudor arches and Tudor chimneys.

Behind the main station building was a three-road goods yard, with a connection facing towards Whitby. The yard was listed as forwarding flour and bran as it chief commodities - the village had a large mill powered by the river. A camping coach was positioned here by the North Eastern Region from 1959 to 1964. A second goods siding was located just across the river (on the south bank) with access to both directions of the running line. This was Sneathonthopre Siding and dealt mostly with cattle. Both goods sidings were closed in early August 1965.

In the early 1980s, rationalisation of the Esk Valley Line led to the singling of the line between Grosmont and Whitby. The down line through the station was kept open, whilst the up line and platform were removed. The signal box was kept open as control for the level crossing until 1986 when it was automated.

Services

As of the May 2021 timetable change, the station is served by five trains per day (four on Sunday) towards Whitby. Heading towards Middlesbrough via Nunthorpe, there are four trains per day. Most trains continue to Newcastle via Hartlepool. All services are operated by Northern Trains.

Rolling stock used: Class 156 Super Sprinter and Class 158 Express Sprinter

Notes

References

Bibliography

External links 

Railway stations in the Borough of Scarborough
DfT Category F2 stations
Railway stations in Great Britain opened in 1847
Northern franchise railway stations
Former York and North Midland Railway stations
George Townsend Andrews railway stations